George Vandamme is a former Belgian wheelchair racer. In 1993, he won the men's wheelchair race of the London Marathon, dominating the race. He set a new course record of 1:44:10, beating the old London course record by nearly eight minutes.

References

Year of birth missing (living people)
Living people
Belgian male wheelchair racers